The Phantom is a 1931 American pre-Code mystery film directed by Alan James.

Premise 
A reporter goes in search of a deranged masked killer hiding in an insane asylum.

Cast
Cast list adapted from Poverty Row Studios, 1929-1940.

Release
The Phantom was released on December 1, 1931.

Reception
In his book on Poverty Row studio films of the 1930s, Michael R. Pitts commented that The Phantom is "a plodding affair with typical character types" noting that the casting of Guinn "Big Boy" Williams as the ace reporter and Allene Ray as the innocent heroine was "unlikely to say the least". Pitts concluded that the film was "far from a classic, The Phantom is worth seeing if only to witness the performances of its two unlikely leads."

References

Sources

External links 
 
 

1931 films
American black-and-white films
Films directed by Alan James
1931 mystery films
American mystery films
1930s English-language films
1930s American films